Isotenes syndesma is a species of moth of the family Tortricidae first described by Józef Razowski in 2013. It is found on Seram Island in Indonesia. The habitat consists of lower montane forests.

The wingspan is about 20 mm. The ground colour of the forewings is whitish cream, reticulated (net like) with brown and glossy in the distal half of the wing. The markings are brown with some darker, diffuse spots. The hindwings are brownish cream.

Etymology
The species name refers to confluent parts of the forewing markings and is derived from Greek desma (meaning a fascia) and syn (meaning together).

References

Moths described in 2013
Archipini